The Seal of Manila is composed of the city's modern coat-of-arms, with colors mirroring those of the Philippine National Flag. It is a modified form of the city's historical arms bestowed in the 16th century.

The arms of the seal consist of a pre-Hispanic shield, horizontally divided into red and blue fields. The top, red half depicts the city's nickname, "Pearl of the Orient", while the lower, blue half is charged with a sea-lion surmounting the waves of the River Pasig and Manila Bay. The sea-lion originally represented the islands's former colonial status as an ultramar (overseas) possession of Spain, and is ultimately derived from the arms of the Kingdom of León.

A white roundel surrounds the arms containing the words Lungsod ng Maynila and Pilipinas (Filipino, "City of Manila"; "Philippines") in Helvetica font (said font officially in use since 2019) and six yellow stars representing the city's six congressional districts.

Historical arms

For easier identification of the city, Manila was granted a coat of arms by a decree issued on 20 March 1596 by King Philip II of Spain. The grant was as follows:

In the 19th century, King Ferdinand VII granted the use and placement of the royal crown above the castle itself as an augmentation of honour by royal cedula of April 23, 1826.

These arms were used since its introduction in 1596 well up to the mid-20th century. While the coat of arms evolved throughout the centuries, adopting different forms and minor changes, its basic elements remained much the same–a castle on red and a sea-lion on blue.

In 1965, Mayor Antonio Villegas introduced a new seal for Manila which featured the palisades of the fort of Rajah Sulayman, the baybayin character for "ka", and the San Agustin Church and the Fort Santiago gate. The motto, in gold was Timbulan ng Laya at Diwang Dakila (English:Buoy of Liberty and a Great Spirit). In the 1970s, the seal was replaced by another design by Galo Ocampo. The symbol like the older iterations featured a sea-lion but did not depict a castle. Ocampo introduced the pearl and seashell element to the seal.

Derivatives

When the Americans established the Insular Government after gaining control of the Philippines, they introduced a coat of arms for the whole Philippine Islands whereby the arms of Manila were an inescutcheon on a shield featuring the colors and stripes representing the United States. Later in 1935, the Commonwealth of the Philippines adapted the Insular Government's arms where, again, the coat of arms of Manila were an inescutcheon but this time, over a shield featuring the colors of the Philippine flag–red, white, and blue; in addition to the three stars added to its chief. However, the colors of the arms of Manila in the coat of arms of the Commonwealth had been altered in color. Instead of the castle having its door and windows in blue, they were made argent. The sea-lion in the lower field was made gold and it now was charged on an argent background. The coat of arms of the Commonwealth was briefly changed in 1942 when the arms of Manila were replaced with a Philippine sun charged on an argent oval. The new coat of arms was abandoned and the 1935 arms were restored and remained in use until the establishment of the Republic in 1946.

While the original 1596 arms has, since the mid-20th century, fallen out of use. The current coat of arms of the Archdiocese of Manila still retains much of what constituted the original arms, albeit modified to include religious elements.

Current usage 

The sea-lion in the original coat of arms of Manila, now more commonly depicted in gold than silver, was eventually utilized in many other symbols of state in the Philippines such as the Seal of the President of the Philippines. It is also a symbol used in many different government departments and organizations such as the Philippine Navy, Department of Education, Department of Finance, Department of Budget and Management, etc. It also features prominently on the insignias of medals and the like such as the Philippine Legion of Honor and the Order of Sikatuna.

Symbolism
The official website of the city government of Manila mentions the symbolism behind specific elements of the seal.

References

Blair and Robertson's Philippine Islands, 1493-1898
Cedulario de la Insigne, Muy Noble y Siempre Leal Ciudad de Manila
Noticias civiles y eclesiásticas de Indias y otros documentos recopilados por Juan Díez de la Calle
The Ancient Archipelagic Ultramar: Symbol of Manila, the Presidency, and the Philippines

Seals of country subdivisions
Manila
Coats of arms with lions
Coats of arms with stars
Coats of arms with swords
Official seals of places in Metro Manila